Iyyamcode Sreedharan (also spelled as Iyyamkode or Iyyamkodu) is a Malayalam language writer from Kerala, India. He is well known in various fields of literature such as travelogue writer, Aattakkatha writer, playwright, poet and biographer. He received several awards including Kerala Sahitya Akademi Award for Overall Contributions, Kerala Sahitya Akademi Award for travelogue, Kerala Kalamandalam Mukundaraja Award and Kerala Kalamandalam Award for outstanding contribution in the field of literature.

Biography
Sreedharan was born on September 4, 1941, in Puthiya veettil House in Iyyamcode near Nadapuram in present-day Kozhikode district of Kerala. His father  M. Narayana Kurup was a teacher, poet, painter and sculptor. His mother, M. P. Karthayani Amma, is the sister of M. P. Narayanan Nambiar, a prominent leader of the Karshaka Sangham, a long-time farmers' movement in Kerala. He had his primary education at Nadapuram C.C. UP School. After passing tenth class from Kadathanad Rajas High School in Kozhikode District, he studied Kathakali chamayam (makeup of Kathakali artists) for three years at the Kerala Kalamandalam in Cheruthuruthy. In 1961, he joined Kollankode Rajas High School in Palakkad district as a teacher in Kathakali chamayam and later became a descendant of poet P. Kunhiraman Nair, who was a colleague there.

Sreedharan started writing poems at the age of fifteen. In 1962, he won the first prize in the Mathrubhumi Weekly poetry competition for students. Subsequently, in 1964, he was awarded the Kerala Sahitya Samithi Poetry Award. He brought together theatre artists from Kollengode and the surrounding areas, and formed a theater troupe in 1975 and performed plays all over Kerala.

He was instrumental in establishing the P. Smaraka Kalakendram (P. Memorial Art Center) at Kollengode in In 1981, in memory of the poet P. Kunhiraman Nair. Iyyamcode has been the secretary of the art centre for the last forty years. In 1988, when he was the secretary of the Kerala Kalamandalam, he formed a Kathakali group named Kerala Kalabhavan and wrote three aattakkathas including 'Kinglier', and performed in many stages including in foreign countries.

Iyankode Sreedharan, who has been one of the directors of the Kerala Institute of Children's Literature held several other positions including member of the Kerala Sahitya Samithi and the Vice President of the Kerala Sangeetha Nataka Akademi. He was a member of the Board of Directors of the Kerala Sahitya Akademi for seven years and was the state secretary of the Purogamana Kala Sahitya Sangh, a group of progressive literary activists. He represented India in World Ramayana Festival.

Personal life
He and his wife Komalavalli have 3 children. His daughter S. K. Kavitha is a Malayalam language poet. They lives in their house 'Sakalya' in Vattekatte near Kollengode in Palakkad district.

Literary works

Poetry collection
Mulakinkodi
Njattu Paattu
Perumbara
Jaya He
Sakshi Mozhi
Patiyirangunna Daivam
Sangha Ganam
Njan Itha Padunnu Veendum

Short story collection

Thalam Thettiya Kalaasangal

Novels

Vadamallika
Appunni

Memoirs
 Memoirs about V. K. N.

Varna Renukkal
Mayil Peelikal
Ormayile Mandasmeram
Ornmayile Madhuryam

Essays and studies

Kochukochu Varthamanangal
Snehadarasamanwitham

Dance Dramas
Malanadu
Kavikal Paadiya Keralam

Biographies
 Biography of Changampuzha Krishna Pillai
 Biography of Vallathol Narayana Menon
 Biography of P. Kunhiraman Nair
 Biography of Kunchan Nambiar
 Based on life of Sukumar Azhikode
</ref> Based on life of Cherukad
Swapnadanam. based on life of P. Kunhiraman Nair

Plays
Ore vargam Ore margam
Ithile
Padayottam

Aattakkathas
Manava Vijayam
Sneha Sandesam
King lier, adaptation of William Shakespeare's play King Lear

Studies and research

Travelogues
King Lierinte Europyan Sanchara Padangal
 In this book, Ramayana from fourteen countries of the world including Uzbekistan, Philippines and Vietnam are mentioned.
Spain Oru Ottapradakshinam

Books on him

 Letters of Mahakavi P. Kunjiraman Nair to Iyyancode Sreedharan
Kalppadukal part 2 titled as Puram, S. K. Vasanthan's memoirs of friendships and cordial interactions with notable personalities including Sreedharan

Awards and honors
 Kerala Sahitya Akademi Award for Overall Contributions 2016.
 Kerala Sahitya Akademi Award 2008 for his travelogue King Lierinte Europyan Sanchara Padangal
 Kerala Kalamandalam M. K. K. Nair Award for outstanding contribution in the field of literature.
 Kerala Kalamandalam 'Mukundaraja Award' for his contributions to Kathakali.
 Abu Dhabi Sakthi Award 1997- for poetry collection Sanghaganam.
 Arts Service International Book Development Committee Award Paris- for his Aattakkatha King Lear
 UNESCO Member International Book Committee Award- for his biography Swapnadanam.
 First literary award instituted by the Professor P. Meerakutty Foundation for his autobiography Swapnadanam.
 First Kaliyachan Award instituted by Cheruthuruthy Kathakali School in memory of P. Kunhiraman Nair.
 K. P. Kesava Menon Award
 First prize in the Mathrubhumi Weekly poetry competition for students, 1962
 Kerala Sahitya Samithi Poetry Award 1964

References

1941 births
Living people
Malayalam-language writers
Malayalam poets
20th-century Indian poets
Poets from Kerala
Indian male poets
Indian biographers
Indian male novelists
Indian male short story writers
Indian male dramatists and playwrights
Indian male essayists
People from Kozhikode district
Recipients of the Kerala Sahitya Akademi Award
Recipients of the Abu Dhabi Sakthi Award